2 Hare Court is a barristers' chambers specialising in criminal and regulatory law, located in the Inner Temple, one of the four Inns of court. Established in the 1967, It employs 61 barristers, including 16 King's Counsel and several former prosecutors, including those who have acted as First Senior, Senior and Junior  Treasury Counsel – barristers appointed by the Attorney General to prosecute the most serious and complex criminal cases to come before the courts.

History
 2 Hare Court is a Grade I listed building that houses barristers' chambers in the Inner Temple. It was named after a nephew of Sir Nicholas Hare, also named Nicholas Hare, who built the first set in 1567. The original buildings were destroyed in a fire in 1678, and the building which is now 1 Hare Court dates from the reconstruction. In 2000, 2 Hare Court building was extensively refurbished.

Practice areas
The set's practice areas include:

 Business Crime
 Regulatory law
 Fraud
 Health and Safety
 Professional Discipline
 Sport, Media and Entertainment

Notable members
Members of chambers have prosecuted and defended in many high-profile criminal cases, including murder and terrorism, with head of chambers Jonathan Laidlaw KC defending News International chief executive Rebekah Brooks accused of phone hacking, Oliver Glasgow KC prosecuting Constance Briscoe, barrister and a part-time judge who was imprisoned for perverting the course of justice in the Chris Huhne scandal, Robert Rinder, barrister specialising in financial crime best known for his role on the reality courtroom series Judge Rinder, who in September 2016 became the first daytime TV judge to compete in the fourteenth series of Strictly Come Dancing,
and Orlando Pownall KC who represented the Premier League footballer Adam Johnson at a trial over child sex allegations.

Former notable members
Former members include The Hon. Mr Justice Edis, who practised in chambers until 2013 when he was appointed a Justice of the High Court, and Dame Bobbie Cheema-Grubb, former member who practised in chambers until November 2015, when she was appointed a High Court judge. David Pannick KC, former member, acted for the lead claimant Gina Miller in the historic 11-justice Supreme Court case.

See also

 Criminal justice
 Criminal defence

References

External links

 Judge Rinder & Oksana Platero dance the Cha Cha to 'Mercy' – Strictly Come Dancing 2016
 The Lammy Review: Seminar hosted by 2 Hare Court chambers at Kings College London
 Judge Robert Rinder on his way to chambers

]

Barristers' chambers in the United Kingdom
1950 establishments in the United Kingdom
Law firms based in London
Law firms of England
Criminal defense organizations
Law firms established in 1950
Government lawyers